In international law, a persistent objector is a sovereign state which has consistently and clearly objected to a norm of customary international law since the norm's emergence, and considers itself not bound to observe the norm. The concept is an example of the positivist doctrine that a state can only be bound by norms to which it has consented.

Objection to the emergence of a norm may come in the form of statements declaring a state's position on an existing right, or action in which a state exercises an existing right in the face of an emerging norm which would threaten that right. Statements made at the time of a rule's establishment, such as in a reservation to a treaty, offer the clearest expression of a state's objection, but objections might also be expressed during treaty negotiations and even in statements by domestic lawmakers accompanying purely municipal legislation.

Judicial support for the persistent objector rule is weak. The International Court of Justice has discussed the persistent objector rule in dicta in two cases: the Asylum case (Colombia v Peru, [1950] ICJ 6) and the Fisheries case (United Kingdom v Norway, [1951] ICJ 3). The Inter-American Commission on Human Rights rejected an attempted assertion of the persistent objector defence in Domingues v United States (2002) on the ground that the prohibition against the juvenile death penalty to which the United States objected was not merely customary international law but jus cogens, a norm from which no derogation was permitted. However, this could also be read as confirming that a persistent objector defence may successfully overcome a norm of international human rights law which has not attained the status of jus cogens.

Stronger support for the rule can be found in the writings of certain jurists. The American Law Institute was historically a major contributor to developing a "comprehensive theory" of persistent objection through its 1987 Third Restatement of the Foreign Relations Law of the United States, part of its Restatements of the Law series.

References

Further reading

International law